Vokey is a surname. Notable people with the surname include:

 Bob Vokey, golf club manufacturer, best known as a brand of Wedge's manufactured by Acushnet Company
 Colby Vokey (born 1965), American lawyer and officer in the United States Marine Corps
 Scott Vokey, Ontario politician